The Three-Body Problem is a Chinese science fiction animated series based on The Dark Forest by Liu Cixin. The series is produced by Bilibili, The Three-Body Universe and YHKT Entertainment, and started airing on Bilibili from 10 December 2022.

Voice cast
 Ma Zhengyang as Luo Ji
 Fan Zheshen as Shi Qiang
 Duan Yixuan as Zhuang Yan
 Duan Yixuan as Elina
 Zhao Chengchen as Wang Miao
 Zhao Chengchen as Ding Yi
 Yang Chen as Ye Wenjie

Episode list

Production and release
The animated series was announced by Bilibili in October 2022. The series is adapted from The Dark Forest by Liu Cixin, the author's second installment in the Remembrance of Earth's Past science fiction novel trilogy. Three-Body Universe, the IP developer that involves the production of the live-action Chinese TV series and the Netflix version, and animation studio YHKT Entertainment co-produced the series with Bilibili. The 15-episode series was scheduled to be released in China on December 3, 2022, but it was postponed to December 10, 2022.

References

External links
 

2022 Chinese television series debuts
Anime based on novels
Chinese science fiction television series
Science fiction anime and manga
Television shows based on Chinese novels